This article does not include the Demographics of Saint John's City

Most Saint Johnstonians (64.02%) were born in Antigua and Barbuda.

References

Saint John Parish